Thomas Lovatt "Tink" Turner (February 20, 1890 – February 25, 1962) was a Major League Baseball pitcher. He started one game for the Philadelphia Athletics in September . In that game, Turner lasted just two innings, giving up 6 runs on five hits while taking the loss against the Chicago White Sox. After his playing career ended, Turner worked for the Athletics as a scout.

See also
 List of St. Louis Cardinals coaches

Sources

Major League Baseball pitchers
Philadelphia Athletics players
St. Louis Cardinals coaches
Raleigh Red Birds players
York White Roses players
Henderson Hens players
Chattanooga Lookouts players
Toledo Mud Hens players
Newark Indians players
Baseball players from Pennsylvania
1890 births
1962 deaths